Foy Hayden Hammons (January 22, 1894 – July 16, 1961) was an American college football player and coach. He served as the head football coach at the First District Agricultural School—now known as Arkansas State University—from 1919 to 1921, at Ouachita Baptist University from 1926 to 1930, and at Arkansas Agricultural and Mechanical College—now known as the University of Arkansas at Monticello—from 1931 to 1933, compiling a career college football record of 44–32–13.

Hammons also coached high school football at Pine Bluff High School and Hope High School in Arkansas. He died in 1961 after a long illness.

Head coaching record

College

References

External links
 

1894 births
1961 deaths
Arkansas State Red Wolves football coaches
Arkansas State Red Wolves football players
Arkansas–Monticello Boll Weevils and Cotton Blossoms athletic directors
Arkansas–Monticello Boll Weevils football coaches
Ouachita Baptist Tigers football coaches
High school football coaches in Arkansas
Sportspeople from Little Rock, Arkansas